Tapestry is a form of woven textile art.

Tapestry or tapestries may also refer to:

Companies
 Tapestry, Inc., formerly Coach, Inc, an American multinational luxury fashion company based in New York City, founded in 1941
 Tapestry Technologies, a small privately owned systems integration defense contractor in Chambersburg, Pennsylvania, founded in 2005

Computing and online games
 Tapestry (DHT), a distributed hash table protocol first described in 2001
 Apache Tapestry, a Java web application framework adopted by the Apache Software Foundation as a top-level project in 2006
 A holographic storage product by InPhase Technologies in 2008

Literature
 Tapestry (Wildstorm), a comic book villainess introduced in 1993
 The Tapestry, a fantasy fiction series by Henry H. Neff introduced in 2007

Music
 Tapestry (Don McLean album), 1970
 "Tapestry", the title song by Don McLean from the 1970 album
 Tapestry (Carole King album), 1971
 "Tapestry", the title song by Carole King from the 1971 album
 Tapestry Revisited: A Tribute to Carole King, a multi-artist tribute album honoring Carole King, 1995
 "Tapestry", a cover of the Carole King song as the title song on the 1995 multi-artist album, in the All-4-One discography
 Tapestry, an album by Bob Belden, 1997
 "Tapestry", a cover of the Carole King song as the title song on the 1997 Bob Belden album
 Tapestry, an album by Keith Getty, 2002
 "Tapestry", a song by Protest the Hero from the 2011 album Scurrilous
 "Tapestry", a song by Hillsong United from the 2013 album Zion
 "Tapestry", a song by Nightmares on Wax from the 2013 album Feelin' Good
 "Tapestries", a song by Sphere3 from the 2002 album Comeuppance

Radio and television
 Tapestry (CBC radio), a Canadian documentary/interview program on spirituality, produced since 1994
 Tapestry (CHFI), a Canadian syndicated FM radio program of the late 1970s and early to mid-1980s with music, commentary, and literary readings
 "Tapestry" (Star Trek: The Next Generation), a 1993 sixth-season episode of Star Trek: The Next Generation

Other uses
 Needlepoint, a form of canvaswork, also called tapestry
 Tapestry (horse), an Irish-breed Thoroughbred racehorse foaled in 2011